is located in the Hidaka Mountains, Hokkaidō, Japan. It is named after Kannon the bodhisattva of compassion.

References
 Geographical Survey Institute

Kannon